The 2009–10 Karnataka State Film Awards, presented by Government of Karnataka, to felicitate the best of Kannada Cinema released in the year 2009. The ceremony was held on 15 May 2012.

Lifetime achievement award

Jury 

A committee headed by Dwarakish was appointed to evaluate the feature films awards.

Film Awards

Other Awards

Controversy
On August 14, 2015 in an unprecedented move, the Government of Karnataka is taking back four State film awards conferred on two films.

The decision on conferring these awards has been questioned by S. Radha in the High Court of Karnataka on the contention that the applications for these awards were accepted after the expiry of the deadline fixed by the government to receive entries. The government, according to sources in the Information Department, is making an all-out effort to “avoid humiliation” and are appealing to the recipients to return the awards.

The taken awards are as follows:
 Best Story - Nagathihalli Chandrashekar for Olave Jeevana Lekkachaara
 Best Male Playback Singer - Tippu
 Best Music Director - V. Harikrishna
 Best Editor - Srinivas P. Babu
Above three awards for Raaj The Showman

References

2009 Indian film awards
2010 Indian film awards